Košarkaški klub Zrinjevac 1937 is a professional men's basketball club based in Zagreb, Croatia. It competes in the Croatian First Basketball League.

Name changes

KS Martinovka (1937–1945)
Element (1945)
Jedinstvo (1946–1952)
Monter (1952–1953)
Montažno (1953–1957)
Jugomontaža (1957—1964)
Trešnjevka (1964—1970)
Industromontaža (1970—1978)
Monting (1978–1988)
Montmontaža (1988—1990)
Industromontaža (1990—1992)
Zrinjevac 1937 (1992–present)

Honours

Domestic
HT Premijer liga finalists: 1994–95

Notable players 
 Franjo Arapović
 Zoran Čutura
 Mario Kasun
 Emilio Kovačić
 Ivica Marić
 Ivan Meheš
 Dario Šarić
 Zdravko Radulović
 Damjan Rudež
 Ivica Zubac
 Damir Tvrdić
 Siniša Kelečević
 Mladen Cetinja

External links
Official Website

KK Zrinjevac
Basketball teams in Croatia
Basketball teams established in 1937
Basketball teams in Yugoslavia
1937 establishments in Croatia